Ramazan Yıldırım (born 7 September 1975) is a German-born Turkish former footballer and manager.

Career

As a player, Yıldırım spent three seasons in the 2. Bundesliga with Rot-Weiss Essen and Kickers Offenbach, as well as one season in the 3. Liga with Eintracht Braunschweig.

Coaching career

After retiring as a player Yıldırım became a youth coach at Eintracht Braunschweig. He was sacked by the club in January 2011 and subsequently took over Rot-Weiss Essen's reserve side in the summer of 2011. During the winter break of the 2011–12 season, Yıldırım was then appointed as manager of Regionalliga Nord side VfB Lübeck. He was released by Lübeck in December 2012. On 28 June 2013 he was appointed manager of Sportfreunde Lotte. He left the club on 3 January 2014.

Coaching record

References

External links

1975 births
Living people
People from Peine (district)
Footballers from Lower Saxony
German people of Turkish descent
Turkish footballers
Turkish football managers
2. Bundesliga players
3. Liga players
TuS Celle FC players
VfB Lübeck players
SSV Jahn Regensburg players
Rot-Weiss Essen players
Kickers Offenbach players
Eintracht Braunschweig players
Eintracht Braunschweig non-playing staff
VfB Lübeck managers
Sportfreunde Lotte managers
Association football midfielders